BGG may refer to:
 Before Green Gables, a novel by Budge Wilson, as a prequel to Anne of Green Gables
 Big Green Gathering, an annual festival in Somerset, England 
 Bingöl Airport, Turkey (IATA code: BGG)
 Black Girl Gamers, a gaming community 
 BoardGameGeek, a board gaming website
 Brigg railway station, Lincolnshire, England (station code: BGG) 
 Briggs & Stratton, an American engine manufacturer (NYSE stock code: BGG) 
 Bugun language of Arunachal Pradesh, India (ISO 639-3 code: bgg)